The Star City Roller Girls was a roller derby league based in Roanoke, Virginia.  Founded in 2006, the league consists of one team which competes against teams from other leagues. SCRG was accepted as a member of the Women's Flat Track Derby Association Apprentice Program in 2011.

References

External links
 
 Flat Track Stats page

Roller derby leagues established in 2006
Roller derby leagues in Virginia
Sports in Roanoke, Virginia
2006 establishments in Virginia